Senator Gutierrez may refer to:

Carl Gutierrez (born 1941), Senate of Guam
Franklin J. Gutierrez, Senate of Guam
Jaime Gutierrez (born 1949), Arizona State Senate